Luiz Gustavo de Almeida Pinto (born 10 March 1993), known as Gustavo, is a Brazilian footballer who plays as a goalkeeper for Criciúma.

Gustavo has previously played in Campeonato Brasileiro Série B for Vitória and Campeonato Brasileiro Série D for Itumbiara.

References

External links
 
 

1993 births
Living people
Sportspeople from Espírito Santo
Brazilian footballers
Association football goalkeepers
Campeonato Brasileiro Série B players
Campeonato Brasileiro Série D players
Esporte Clube Vitória players
Associação Desportiva Jequié players
Itumbiara Esporte Clube players
Esporte Clube Novo Hamburgo players
Atlético Clube Goianiense players
Grêmio Novorizontino players
Sampaio Corrêa Futebol Clube players
Brazil youth international footballers